Porfirio Smerdou (February 12, 1905 – May 11, 2002) was a Mexican consul.

1905 births
2002 deaths
Mexican diplomats